Lauriston Girls' School is an independent, non-denominational, day school for girls, located in Armadale, an inner south-eastern suburb of Melbourne, Victoria, Australia.

The school follows the motto; Sancte, Sapienter, Strenue. This motto is Latin for Holiness, Wisdom, Strength.

Established in 1901, Lauriston has a non-selective enrolment policy and is co-educational for three-year-old and four-year-old Kindergarten, and girls-only from Prep through to Year 12. The school currently caters for approximately 1040 students and offers the Victorian Certificate of Education (VCE) and is also one of the few Victorian schools that offer the International Baccalaureate (IB) for the Year 11/12 students.

Lauriston is affiliated with the Association of Heads of Independent Schools of Australia (AHISA), the Junior School Heads Association of Australia (JSHAA), the Alliance of Girls' Schools Australasia (AGSA), the Association of Independent Schools of Victoria (AISV), and is a founding member of Girls Sport Victoria (GSV).

Campus
Armadale

Lauriston's main campus is located in Armadale, seven kilometres from the Melbourne CBD. The Armadale campus is architecturally interesting as it comprises not only classic Victorian buildings (such as Montrose and Blairholme in the primary school area), but also newer buildings such as a science and technology centre constructed from energy-efficient, environmentally-friendly materials. A new gymnasium and wellbeing centre is currently under construction. Kindergarten through to Year 12, excluding year 9, are educated at the Armadale campus.

Howqua
Howqua is a rural campus for Lauriston's year 9 students, located near the town of Mansfield in the Victorian high country. Attendance is compulsory for all year 9 students, with the girls spending the whole school year on the campus as full-time boarders. Students complete a full academic program along with a fitness and challenging outdoor program. Students at Howqua participate in activities such as downhill and cross-country skiing, horse riding, solo camping, hiking, rafting, rock climbing and other outdoor recreational activities, culminating the year with a 6-day hike through Victoria's mountainous regions. Students also participate in a community service rotation during term 2, which involves activities such as building tracks, planting trees, gardening, visiting residential homes, acting as assistant teachers in rural schools, and running their own radio station.

There are 10 houses, each able to hold between 10 and 12 girls. These houses are Hollyer, Gillespie, Thompson, O'Brien, Fitz-Gibbon, Wirringga, Arthur-Robinson, Cramond, Mirrabooka and Kirkpatrick. Each house has beds, a bathroom, a kitchenette, dining/main area, wardrobe spaces, hike room, drying room and two balconies. The campus also offers a dining hall, a fire shelter, classrooms, Resource centre/library, music rooms, health centre, art centre, dance studio and staff houses. The campus offers a series of running tracks that are used weekly for a sequential fitness program. At the end of each term, a running challenge of 9.4 km is to be run in 1hr, called the Howqua River Road Challenge.

It began in 1993 and in 1997 it became compulsory for students to attend the Howqua campus for the duration of a full school year. Originally students stayed at Howqua for 1 semester only, now it is compulsory for them to stay the whole year. Girls return home once a term on exeats (3 to 5 days), and return home again for term holidays throughout the year.

The concept of Howqua is to help girls develop emotionally and physically independent of their family in a world without constant technology. Mobile phones are banned from use at Howqua and internet access is highly restricted. The girls at Howqua are issued each with devices used for learning purposes and are only accessible during the school day under teacher supervision. The Howqua program also aims to forge strong relationships between girls and social skills are greatly developed. All-year-round Howqua girls are urged to push themselves to achieve their goals, strengthening their sense of self-determination. The year leads up to many major end-of-year challenges, including a 17.3 km run from Telephone Box Junction on Mt Stirling to the summit of Mt Buller.

In the 2006/2007 summer holidays, bushfires greatly threatened the Howqua Campus.
The campus was also very threatened by fires and evacuated for the first time in early 2009.

Curriculum
The Lauriston curriculum is managed within five learning areas, based on the developmental stages of children and adolescents. 
Kindergarten: 3 and 4 Year Old
Junior School: Transition Prep to Year 6
7/8 Centre: Year 7 and 8
Howqua: Year 9
Senior College: Year 10, 11 and 12

Upon graduation, Lauriston students typically achieve high Australian Tertiary Admission Rank (ATAR) and International Baccalaureate (IB) scores. In 2016, 7% of students received an ATAR of 99 or over, 36% achieved 95 or over, and 60% of students received ATAR scores of 90 or over. The school has consistently ranked highly across the state, with a median VCE study score in 2016 of 36.

Co-curriculum

Music
Lauriston's music program caters for students from Prep to year 12 and offers a number of choral and instrumental ensembles, including bands and orchestras. Annually, there are approximately twenty-five performance occasions, including the 'Annual School Concert', which is held at the Melbourne Recital Centre.

From Years 3 and 4, a compulsory string orchestra group is formed. Violin, viola, cello, and double bass is assigned to them.

Lauriston also stages one musical and one play each year, one for students in years 5 to 8 and another for years 10 to 12. Recent performances include Seussical, Charlie and the Chocolate Factory, The Little Mermaid Jr, and Mary Poppins Jr.

Sport
Lauriston offers over 20 sports, which may be played at both competitive and recreational level. The school is an inaugural member of Girls Sport Victoria (GSV), an association of 24 girls schools throughout Melbourne. Through GSV, students in years 7 to 12 may compete at an inter-school level in athletics, basketball, cricket, cross country, diving, golf, hockey, indoor cricket, netball, soccer, softball, swimming, tennis, volleyball, and water polo.

Lauriston has a successful history in rowing. They usually compete in IVs but have occasionally raced a VIII. At the 2010 Head of the Schoolgirls Regatta the Lauriston senior crews won the Div 1 schoolgirl IV, Div 2 schoolgirl IV and Div 3 schoolgirl IV. The first IV were national gold medallists in the Schoolgirl IV in 2010, 2011 and 2013 and won a bronze medal in 2015.

GSV premierships 
Lauriston has won the following GSV premierships.

 Cricket - 2014
 Hockey - 2007
 Indoor Cricket (2) - 2014, 2015
 Soccer - 2014
 Tennis - 2001
 Water Polo (7) - 2005, 2006, 2007, 2009, 2010, 2011, 2013

Notable alumnae 
Alumnae of Lauriston Girls' School are known as 'Old Lauristonians', and may elect to join the school's alumni association, the 'Old Lauristonian Association' (OLA). Some notable 'Old Lauristonians' include:

Hildred Mary Butler – microbiologist
Margaret Carnegie AO – writer, art patron and collector
 Coco-Jacinta Cherian – actress (Neighbours, Taj)
Deborah Conway – singer
Esme Mary Sorrett (Molly) Fink – Rani of Pudukota (wife of Marthanda Bhairava Tondiman, rajah of the southern India principality of Pudukota)
Beattie Goad – soccer player with Melbourne Victory and Melbourne City
Chloe Hooper – writer and novelist
Sybil Howy Irving MBE – founder and controller of the Australian Women's Army Service
Felicity Kennett – former presenter of Network Ten TV lifestyle program Healthy, Wealthy and Wise; Wife of former Victorian Premier Jeff Kennett
Poppy King – businesswoman; Young Australian of the Year 1995 (also attended Wesley College, Melbourne)
Elizabeth Kilgour Kirkhope – former headmistress of Lowther Hall Anglican Grammar School; former owner and headmistress of Lauriston Girls' School (dux and head prefect 1914)
Jo Lane – artist
Kit Willow Michelmore – fashion designer
Livinia Nixon – Channel 9 presenter and the Ambassador and face for the City of Melbourne
Linda Phillips OBE – composer, pianist and music critic
Phoebe Roberts – actress
Heli Simpson – actress, The Saddle Club
Sarina Singh – writer, author, filmmaker
Fiona Stewart – founder of NotGoodEnough.org and partner of Philip Nitschke
Kathleen Alice Syme – journalist, company director and welfare worker
Jessie Vasey – founder of the War Widows' Guild of Australia (also attended Methodist Ladies' College, Melbourne)

See also 
 List of schools in Victoria
 Victorian Certificate of Education
 International Baccalaureate
 C. Rasmussen, Lauriston: 100 years of Educating Girls, Helicon Press, Sydney 1999
 1940 Lauriston School hosted the world premiere of The Magic Basket

References

External links
 Lauriston Girls' School website
 Girls Sport Victoria

Girls' schools in Victoria (Australia)
Educational institutions established in 1901
Nondenominational Christian schools in Melbourne
Junior School Heads Association of Australia Member Schools
International Baccalaureate schools in Australia
1901 establishments in Australia
Buildings and structures in the City of Stonnington